Märt Kubo (born 11 April 1944 in Tarvastu Parish, Viljandi County) is an Estonian theatre pedagogue, critic and politician. In 1992, he was Minister of Culture. He was a member of VIII Riigikogu.

Kubo studied clarinet at the Viljandi Music School, graduating in 1960, and then graduated from Viljandi Secondary School No. 2 in 1962. In 1970, he graduated from Tartu State University with a degree in history  and was a postgraduate student and lecturer at the university between 1970 and 1980. He was the director of the Noosoo Theatre between 1990 and 1992. In 1992 he was the  Minister of Culture of the Transitional Government. From 1993 until 1995, he was the editor of Teater. Muusika. Kino magazine. From 2000 until 2001, he was the chairman of the Estonian Coalition Party and compiled the book Eesti Koonderakond 1991–2001 in 2001.

Kubo has published articles on theatrr and film, compiled the books Rahvusooper Estonia 1998–2003 in 2003 and Rahvusooper Estonia 2003–2008 in 2008, which  detailed the history of the Estonian National Opera. Kubo is the chairman of the administrative board of the National Opera Foundation operating at the Estonian National Culture Foundation.

References

1944 births
Living people
Estonian Coalition Party politicians
Members of the Riigikogu, 1995–1999
Ministers of Culture of Estonia
Estonian theatre directors
Estonian critics
Estonian male writers
20th-century Estonian writers
21st-century Estonian writers
Estonian non-fiction writers
University of Tartu alumni
Academic staff of the University of Tartu
People from Viljandi Parish
Male non-fiction writers